Hans Reitzels Forlag, founded in 1949, is a Danish publishing house that publishes fiction and textbooks in psychology, social work, education, social sciences, humanities, economics, law, communication and organization and direction subjects.

It is part of the Gyldendal publishing group based in Copenhagen, Denmark.

References

External links 

Book publishing companies of Denmark
Mass media companies based in Copenhagen
Danish companies established in 1949
Companies based in Copenhagen Municipality